Ayad Khalil Zaki (Arabic: اياد خليل زكي) was an Iraqi Army General. A career Combat engineering officer, he later served as the Governor of Muthanna Province after retiring from military service.

Zaki was a Sunni Arab from Baghdad.

He served as the Iraqi field commander during the second Anfal Campaign. By 1990 Zaki was the Commander of the IV Corps of the Iraqi Army.

By 1991 Zaki had been promoted to the position of Armed Forces Assistant Chief of Staff for Supplies and Logistics. In early December 1994 Zaki was one of the Generals called on by Wafiq as-Samarra to revolt when Samarra defected.

Zaki served as Assistant Chief of Staff until being made the Governor of Muthanna Province.

Zaki left Iraq following the 2004 Invasion of Iraq and the overthrow of the Ba'athist government and traveled to Jordan  He died on the 22 August 2013.

Command and Staff positions held

 Second in Command, Sapper Platoon 1956-57
 Pioneers and Sappers Platoon Leader - 1957-1959
 Combat Engineering officers company leader and battalion staff officer course, Soviet Union - 1959-1960
 Second in Command, Sapper Company - 1960-1962
 Commanding Officer, B Sapper Company, 2nd Sapper Battalion, 5th Motorised Brigade - 1962-1964
 Combined Arms/All-Arms Operations Officers Course, Soviet Union - 1964-1965
 Adjutant, 1st Field Engineer Regiment, 1st Division - 1965-1967
 Instructor, Military Engineering College - 1967-1968
 Commanding Officer, 2nd Infantry Battalion, 12th Armoured Brigade, 3rd Armoured Division - 1968-1971
 Higher Command and Staff College Course (Frunze University), Soviet Union - 1971-1972
 GSO-I, 2nd Infantry Brigade, 1st Division - 1972-1976
 Executive Staff Officer, Personnel and Training Division, Army General Headquarters Baghdad - 1976-1979
 Commander, 14th Infantry Brigade, 4th Division - 1979-1982
 Commander, 2nd Combat Engineering Brigade, II Corps - 1982-1984
 General Officer Commanding, 5th Infantry Division, 1984-1987
 GSO-I and Chief of Operations, II Corps - 1987-1990
 General Officer Commanding, IV Corps - 1990-1994
 Assistant Minister of Defence, Deputy Chief of Staff of the Army and Chief of Supplies and Logistics - 1994-1999

Ranks

 Second Lieutenant  - 1956-57
 Lieutenant  - 1957-1960
 Captain  - 1960-1965
 Major  - 1965-1968
 Lieutenant Colonel  - 1968-1972
 Colonel  - 1972-1979
 Brigadier  - 1979-1984
 Major General  - 1984-1989
 Lieutenant General  - 1989-1995
 Colonel General ( Full General )  - 1995-1999

References

Governors of Muthanna Governorate
Iraqi generals
Iraqi soldiers
2013 deaths
Year of birth missing